Francisco Zas (born 19 February 1972) is a Spanish taekwondo practitioner. He competed in the men's 68 kg event at the 2000 Summer Olympics.

References

1972 births
Living people
Spanish male taekwondo practitioners
Olympic taekwondo practitioners of Spain
Taekwondo practitioners at the 2000 Summer Olympics